Montigny-sur-Loing (literally Montigny on Loing) is a commune in the Seine-et-Marne department in the Île-de-France region in north-central France. Montigny-sur-Loing station has rail connections to Montargis, Melun and Paris. Inhabitants are referred to as Montignons.

Notable residents

Shelley Steiner (born 1961), Canadian Olympic fencer

In literature

Andre Mariolle (the main character of Guy de Maupassant's novell Our Heart) rented a house in Montigny-sur-Loing.

See also
Communes of the Seine-et-Marne department

References

External links

Official site 
1999 Land Use, from IAURIF (Institute for Urban Planning and Development of the Paris-Île-de-France région) 

Communes of Seine-et-Marne